Yevgeny Erastov (born 1963 in Gorky, Russia) is a Russian author and poet. His poems were translated into English, Spanish, Bulgarian, German.

Early life 
He entered Gorky Medical Institute in 1980, wherein a largely circulated newspaper, the world was given his poetry for the first time. In his second year, he began to attend associations such as "Danko", "Volozka", "Stryna", "Marafon".

Eugene has a medical degree.

Career 
In 1989, he was a member of IX All-Union Conference of young writers. As a result of this, his poetry book "Oblako" (Cloud) was recommended to the publishing house "Molodaya Gvardia". But because of the USSR's collapse, the editorial office ceased to exist.

In 1992, Eugene entered Maxim Gorky Literature Institute (Correspondence Department) in Moscow. One of his teachers was writer Yuri Kyznecov. Eugene was allowed to enter "The Union of Russia's Writers" in 1998. At this time, in parallel, he defended two theses on medicine.

His poems were published in magazines as such as: Volga, Moscow, Friendship of Nations, The Star, and New World. He has been published abroad – in journals in the US, Germany and Cuba. He is the author of five poetry and four prose books.

Recognition 
He won the Nizniy Novgorod's Award (2008). He won international poetry competitions "The Christmas Star" (2011) and "Tsvetaeva's Fall" (2011).

List of publications

Magazines 
 «Вертикаль» (Н. Новгород) (вып.14, 2005: вып.36, 2012)
 «Волга» (№ 1, 1992)
 «Дружба народов» (№ 3, 1996)
 «Звезда» (№ 2, 2000)
 «Литературен свят»  (Болгария) ( вып.45, 2012)
 "Matanzas" (Куба) (№ 1, 2007)
 «Москва» (№ 12, 1994; № 12, 1995; № 7, 1997; № 11, 2003;№ 5, 2004; № 4, 2006; № 5, 2006; № 3, 2007; № 7, 2007; № 3, 2009; № 4, 2010; №5, 2011; №12, 2011; №7, 2012)
 «Московский вестник» (№ 5–6, 1996)
 «Наш современник» (№ 4, 2003; № 5, 2004; № 1, 2006; № 6, 2006; № 7, 2010 ;№9, 2011; №8, 2012)
 «Нижний Новгород» (№ 10, 1997; № 7, 1998; № 12, 1998; № 6, 1999; № 7, 1999; № 3, 2000)
 «Новый мир» (№ 4, 2004)

References

 erastovpisatel.ucoz.ru
 Автор читает свои стихи 
 Writer is reading his poetry ,

External links
 Поэзия сопротивления (Poetry of resistance) 
 Журнал «Подъём»
 
 
 Bulgarian translation

20th-century Russian poets
Russian male poets
1963 births
Living people
21st-century Russian poets
21st-century male writers
20th-century Russian male writers